Okpo is a village in Madaya Township, Pyin Oo Lwin District, in the Mandalay Region of central Myanmar. It is located northeast of  Madaya and lies on the Mandalay Canal, just south of the Madaya River. In the 16th century, the Gwe Shans built a stockade in the village.

References

External links
Maplandia World Gazetteer

Populated places in Pyin Oo Lwin District
Madaya Township